Jens Juul Eriksen (9 July 1926 – 29 July 2004) was a Danish cyclist. He competed in the men's tandem event at the 1952 Summer Olympics.

References

External links
 

1926 births
2004 deaths
Danish male cyclists
Olympic cyclists of Denmark
Cyclists at the 1952 Summer Olympics
Sportspeople from Aarhus